Krueng Cunda River is a river in Aceh on Sumatra island, in Indonesia, about 1700 km northwest of the capital Jakarta. It forms a strait separating the main part of Lhokseumawe from the island of Sumatra.

Geography
The river flows in the northern area of Sumatra with predominantly tropical rainforest climate (designated as Af in the Köppen-Geiger climate classification). The annual average temperature in the area is 25 °C. The warmest month is August, when the average temperature is around 26 °C, and the coldest is December, at 22 °C. The average annual rainfall is 2568 mm. The wettest month is December, with an average of 572 mm rainfall, and the driest is March, with 114 mm rainfall.

See also
List of rivers of Indonesia
List of rivers of Sumatra

References

External links 
  Bappeda Kota Lhokseumawe
  Facebook Link Kota Lhokseumawe

Rivers of Aceh
Rivers of Indonesia